Uffe is a male given name. Notable people with the given name include:

 Uffe of Angel, a legendary king of the Angles mentioned in the Anglo-Saxon Chronicle
 Uffe Baadh, a.k.a. Frank Bode (1923–1980), Danish jazz musician who emigrated to the United States
 Uffe Bech (b. 1993), Danish footballer
 Uffe Elbæk (b. 1954), Danish social worker, author, journalist, entrepreneur and politician
 Uffe Ellemann-Jensen (1941–2022), Danish politician
 Uffe Haagerup (1949–2015), Danish mathematician
 Uffe Markussen (b. 1952), Danish jazz reedist
 Uffe Pedersen (b. 1954), former Danish football player, manager
 Uffe Ravnskov (b. 1934), Danish medical doctor
 Uffe Schultz Larsen (1921–2005), Danish sport shooter

Danish masculine given names